Itchen Stoke and Ovington is an English civil parish consisting of two adjoining villages in Hampshire, England,  west of Alresford town centre in the valley of the River Itchen,  north-east of Winchester, and  south-east of Itchen Abbas.

Itchen Stoke
The village population is 210, including Abbotstone. Its most notable buildring is the Church of St Mary, a redundant Anglican church built by the civil engineer and architect Henry Conybeare in 1856, now under the care of the Churches Conservation Trust. It is in an early French style, Grade II* listed and made of brown and grey rubble stone with limestone dressings.

History
The manor of Itchen Stoke was granted to the Bishop of Winchester by King Edgar in 960. The Domesday Book records the manor as having passed to Romsey Abbey, which retained it until the Dissolution of the Monasteries. It then passed to Sir William Paulet, later the first Marquess of Winchester and stayed with his family until the time of the Commonwealth. Itchen Stoke Mill (with an attached miller's cottage) is of ancient origin. The current building dates from the 18th century and straddles the mill race. Itchen Stoke House is 19th century, has nine bays and is central with small grounds; this being the former rectory.

Abbotstone
This outlying north-east hamlet of a few houses has a population of 32. It was formerly in its own civil parish and lies along the Ellisfield to Itchen Abbas portion of the Three Castles Path Abbotstone contains an abandoned medieval village, with further details at the charity English Heritage's website and evidence of fortifications, as well as several abandoned quarries.

The traveller Celia Fiennes, who made extensive tours riding side-saddle, passed through "Aberstone" in 1691. She noticed the house of the Duke of Bolton "which stands on the side of a hill where are fine Gardens and much fruite."

Ovington

The village on the opposite south bank, of the River Itchen, known upstream as the River Alre in New Alresford and Old Alresford, has a population of 163 and several homes, including an Old Rectory. Its largest building in the central area is Ovington House, of no great antiquity, but its North Lodge is listed as Grade II. There is a pub, the Bush Inn.

Its church is dedicated to St Peter and is Grade II listed.

Extending to the far south into the South Downs National Park, the parish reaches a Scheduled ancient rectangular enclosure.

History
The name appears in the Domesday Book as "Ofinetune", which means "the place above" in Old English.

The revenues from the manor at Ovington supported Itchen's nuns until 1284 when it was sold to the monks of St. Swithun's Priory, Winchester Cathedral. On the Dissolution of the monasteries (1534–61), it was transferred to the newly formed Dean and Chapter of the cathedral. The manorial rights were disputed in 1855–59 between the Baroness van Zandt and the Bishop of Winchester. After this was resolved, it became the property of the Hewson family.

Governance
The parish elects every four years one representative to Hampshire County Council, this is currently:

The parish elects one representative to the City of Winchester District Council, currently:

References

External links
A vision of Ovington @ visionofbritain.org
Stained Glass Windows at St. Peter, Ovington, Hampshire
Stained Glass Windows at St. Mary, Itchen Stoke, Hampshire

Civil parishes in Winchester